Sundae Town is an area of Seoul, South Korea in the Sillim-dong division of the city.  Sundae Town is known for a style of South Korean street food called sundae bokkeum and involves stuffing dangmyeon (noodles) and vegetables mixed with pigs blood into sausage-like casings.  The 'sausages' are then steamed and have a similar consistency to black pudding or other similar blood sausage products.

The area's origins date from a sundae bokkeum restaurant in Sillim market.  The market was replaced in the early 1990s by a shopping center but many restaurants continue the tradition and as of 2019, there were thirty restaurants serving it.

References 

Neighbourhoods of Gwanak-gu